The 2009 FIBA Oceania Championship for Women was the 13th edition of the tournament. The tournament featured a two-game series between Australia and New Zealand. Game one was held in Wellington, New Zealand and game two in Canberra, Australia.

Results

References

External links
 FIBA Oceania website

2009 in basketball
2009 in Australian sport
International basketball competitions hosted by Australia
FIBA Oceania Championship for Women
2009 in Oceanian sport
2009–10 in Australian basketball